Öjsjömyrarna Nature Reserve is a nature reserve in Jämtland County in Sweden. It is part of the EU-wide Natura 2000-network.

Öjsjömyrarna Nature Reserve has been created to protect a number of different kinds of wetlands. Between 2010–2015, some of the wetlands were restored through the EU-funded LIFE Programme.

References

Nature reserves in Sweden
Natura 2000 in Sweden
Tourist attractions in Jämtland County
Geography of Jämtland County
Protected areas established in 1998
1998 establishments in Sweden